Baylin High Cross is a high cross and National Monument located near Athlone, County Westmeath, Ireland.

Location

Description
The cross is believed to have been moved, perhaps from Clonmacnoise. On the east face was a lion and a scroll of interlaced creatures with birdlike heads running up the shaft, and a Celtic knot pattern at the centre of the head. The North face shows a hunting scene with a horseman with spear and a dog biting a deer's leg.

There is an inscription at the bottom of the west face dating the cross to around AD 800: the inscription reads OROIT AR TUATHGALL LAS DERNATH IN CHROSSA ("A Prayer for Tuathgal who caused this cross to be made"), referring to the Abbot of Clonmacnoise who died in 811.

References

National Monuments in County Westmeath
High crosses in the Republic of Ireland